The inferior thyroid artery  is an artery in the neck. It arises from the thyrocervical trunk and passes upward, in front of the vertebral artery and longus colli muscle. It then turns medially behind the carotid sheath and its contents, and also behind the sympathetic trunk, the middle cervical ganglion resting upon the vessel.

Reaching the lower border of the thyroid gland it divides into two branches, which supply the postero-inferior parts of the gland, and anastomose with the superior thyroid artery, and with the corresponding artery of the opposite side.

Structure
The branches of the inferior thyroid artery are the inferior laryngeal, the oesophageal, the tracheal, the ascending cervical and the pharyngeal arteries.

The inferior laryngeal artery climbs the trachea to the back part of the larynx under cover of the inferior pharyngeal constrictor muscle. It is accompanied by the recurrent nerve, and supplies the muscles and mucous membrane of this part, anastomosing with the branch from the opposite side, and with the superior laryngeal branch of the superior thyroid artery.

The tracheal branches of the inferior thyroid artery are distributed on the trachea, and anastomose below with the bronchial arteries.

The esophageal branches of the inferior thyroid artery supply the esophagus, and anastomose with the esophageal branches of the aorta.

The ascending cervical artery is a small branch which arises from the inferior thyroid artery as it passes behind the carotid sheath; it runs up on the anterior tubercles of the transverse processes of the cervical vertebrae in the interval between the anterior scalene muscle and the longus capitis. The ascending cervical artery gives twigs to the neck muscles and these anastomose with branches of the vertebral arteries. One or two spinal branches are sent into the spinal canal, through the intervertebral foramina to be distributed to the spinal cord and its membranes, and to the bodies of the vertebrae. It then anastomoses with the ascending pharyngeal and occipital arteries.

The pharyngeal branches of the inferior thyroid artery supply the pharynx.

The glandular branches of the inferior thyroid artery are small branches which directly supply the thyroid gland.

Clinical significance
The relationship between the recurrent laryngeal nerve and inferior thyroid artery is highly variable.
The recurrent laryngeal nerve passes upward generally behind, but occasionally in front of, the inferior thyroid artery. This makes it vulnerable to injury during surgery that involves ligating the inferior thyroid artery, such as excision of the lower pole of the thyroid gland. Also as the parathyroid is mainly supplied by inferior thyroid artery accidental ligation during thyroidectomy can cause hypoparathyroidism.

The injection of dye into the inferior thyroid artery can be used as an alternate method in identification the recurrent laryngeal nerve.

Additional images

See also
 Glandular branches of the superior thyroid artery

References

External links
 

  - "Larynx: Recurrent Laryngeal Nerve and Inferior Laryngeal Artery"

Arteries of the head and neck
Thyroid